Gonna Get You is the second album by the British jazz-funk/post-disco group Freeez, released in United Kingdom on 1983 by Beggars Banquet, and in Japan on 1984 by Victor Musical Industries.

The album was produced by American electro/freestyle musician and DJ Arthur Baker, well known for his work for Afrika Bambaataa or Planet Patrol.

The album was recorded in New York between July–December 1982.

Track listing 
 "We've Got The Juice"  – 6:19
 "Can't Keep My Love"  – 5:05
 "Love's Gonna Get You"  - 5:58
 "Pop Goes My Love/Scratch Goes My Dub"  – 8:10
 "I.O.U."   – 8:26
 "Freezin'"  – 6:08
 "Can You"   – 5:51
 "Watch Me"  – 5:40

Performers 
Andy Stennett - synthesizer, glockenspiel, backing vocals
Andy Wallace, Frank Heller, Fred Zarr, Jay Burnett, John Robie, Marc Berry, Mike Theodore, Peter Robbins - engineers
Tina B - backing vocals
John Rocca - congas, bongos, vocals, hand percussion
Fred Zarr - piano, synthesizer
Andy Barrett Schwartz - synthesizer
Arthur Baker - drum machine, producer, arranger, mixed-by

Charts

References

External links 
[ "Gonna Get You"] at AMG.com
"Gonna Get You" at Discogs.com

Freeez albums
1983 albums
Albums produced by Arthur Baker (musician)
Beggars Banquet Records albums